Nowe Polaszki  is a village in the administrative district of Gmina Stara Kiszewa, within Kościerzyna County, Pomeranian Voivodeship, in northern Poland. It is located within the historic region of Pomerania.

The village has a population of 460.

The settlement Warszawa is part of the village.

Nowe Polaszki was a royal village of the Polish Crown, administratively located in the Tczew County in the Pomeranian Voivodeship.

During the German occupation of Poland (World War II), in 1939, several Polish families were expelled from the village to the transit camp in Wysin and afterwards to the General Government.

References

Nowe Polaszki